The 1929 Ohio Bobcats football team was an American football team that represented Ohio University as a member of the Buckeye Athletic Association (BAA) during the 1929 college football season. In their sixth season under head coach Don Peden, the Bobcats compiled a perfect 9–0 record, won the Buckeye Athletic Association championship, shut out seven of nine opponents, and outscored all opponents by a total of 306 to 13.

Schedule

References

Ohio
Ohio Bobcats football seasons
College football undefeated seasons
Ohio Bobcats football